Ville Oksanen (born 25 February 1987) is a Finnish retired footballer.

References

External links
 
 Ville Oksanen at Suomen Palloliito 

1987 births
Living people
Finnish footballers
Veikkausliiga players
Myllykosken Pallo −47 players
FC Kuusysi players
Kotkan Työväen Palloilijat players
JIPPO players
Mikkelin Palloilijat players
FC KooTeePee players
Association football midfielders